Oxychona maculata is a species of  tropical air-breathing land snail, a pulmonate gastropod mollusc in the family Bulimulidae.

Distribution 
Oxychona maculata occurs in southern Bahia state, Brazil. It is only known from the municipalities of Ilhéus (the type locality) and Itapetinga.

References

Bulimulidae
Gastropods described in 2013